Bobby Soxer also Htet Htet (born Htet Htet Aung on 22 May 1993) is a Burmese singer, songwriter, composer, actress and fashion model. She is considered one of the early female hip-hop vocalists in Myanmar and has been dubbed as the "Myanmar's Hip Hop Queen".

Early life and education
Bobby Soxer was born on 22 May 1993 in Yangon, Myanmar to parents Aung Zaw Lin, a trader and his wife Moe Theingi. She is the youngest daughter of two siblings, having an elder brother Soe Lin Phyo, a model. She attended high school at Basic Education High School No. 1 Dagon and graduated from the National Management College, Myanmar.

Music career

2006–2010: Career beginnings and recognition

Bobby began her music career in 2006. She released underground hip-hop songs since before she got her big break. She gained recognition from singing together with R&B singer Ye Lay in a song "Do Not Want To Say Good Bye" at her age 13. She rose to fame in music industry with her hit song "Pwe". Since then, she gained the first recognition from her fans.

2011–2014: Collaborative success
Bobby released an album "Done Pyan" (Rocket) which was a duo album with Hlwan Paing on 21 November 2011. This album won the "Best Music Album Award", awarded by both Shwe FM and City FM. They donated 1 million Myanmar Kyats from selling gained gold prize for Rocket album to orphan children from Thu Kha Yike Myone charity organization. Since she has released a duet album, she engaged in shooting commercial advertisements, stage performances, and many concerts at various locations throughout Myanmar. At the same time, she also sang a lot of songs, cooperating with Hlwan Paing and artists from Rock$tar group.

Booby sang a song "Ko Ko", together with Hlwan Paing and Eaint Chit, that song won the "Best Music Award" at the Shwe FM Awards. Bobby collaborated with local hip-hop artist Sai Sai Kham Leng and Coca-Cola Myanmar to launch a song for the 2014 FIFA World Cup campaign, "The World is Ours".

2015–present: Solo debut and rising popularity

Bobby started endeavoring to be able to produce and distribute a solo album. She launched her debut solo album "#21" on 8 February 2015. The follow-up video album was released in July 2015. Bobby is considered one of the most commercially successful Burmese female singer and has been dubbed as the "Myanmar's Hip Hop Queen".

Acting career
Bobby Soxer has been presenting and acting in a travel documentary called Let's Go together with other artists, Hlwan Paing, Bunny Phyoe, Kyaw Htut Swe, Nan Thu Zar and Nan Myat Phyo Thin.

She made her acting debut with a leading role in the film Ar Shwee Tae Ko Ko, alongside Lu Min and directed by Nyunt Myanmar Nyi Nyi Aung, released in March 2015.

Brand Ambassadorships
Bobby Soxer was appointed as a brand ambassador of Coca-Cola on 26 July 2013 and she participated in Open Happiness marketing campaign which is distributing new style of Coca-Cola bottles. She was also brand ambassador of Samsung Mobile Myanmar, SPY Wine Cooler and Ve Ve.

Filmography

Film
Ar Shwee Tae Ko Ko (2015)

Discography

Solo albums
#21 (2015)

Duo albums
Done Pyan (2011)

Personal life
Bobby Soxer is in a relationship with Burmese hip hop singer Hlwan Paing since 2009.

References

External links

 https://bobbysoxer.com
BS.OrgRockstarmail

1993 births
Living people
21st-century Burmese women singers
Burmese singer-songwriters
Burmese film actresses
Burmese female models
Burmese women rappers
People from Yangon